Hannah Blake was born in London, England on 5 May 2000 who plays for Perth Glory in the A-League Women and has represented New Zealand in association football at both age group and international level.

College career
During her time at college, starting in 2019, Blake played soccer for the Michigan Wolverines in the NCAA Division I, studying on a soccer scholarship. She graduated in late 2022 earning a Bachelor of Arts in communications and media together with a minor in business administration. She felt the playing style was different, including a physical style of play. While playing, she used her international experience with New Zealand's national team to improve her game.

Club career
From 2015 until 2019, Blake played for New Zealand club Three Kings United in the Lotto NRFL Women's Premier League.

In January 2023, after graduating from college, Blake signed her first professional contract with A-League Women club Perth Glory, signing as an injury replacement player for Rylee Baisden until the end of the 2022–23 A-League Women season. She scored on her debut in a 3-1 win against Western United in February.

International career
Blake was a member of the New Zealand U-17 side at the 2016 FIFA U-17 Women's World Cup in Jordan, the 2016 FIFA U-20 Women's World Cup in Papua New Guinea, and again at the 2018 FIFA U-20 Women's World Cup in France.

Blake made her senior début as a substitute in a 0–0 draw with Thailand on 25 November 2017.

References

Living people
2000 births
Women's association football midfielders
Association footballers from Auckland
New Zealand women's association footballers
New Zealand women's international footballers
Expatriate women's soccer players in the United States
New Zealand expatriate sportspeople in the United States
New Zealand expatriate women's association footballers
Footballers from Greater London
Michigan Wolverines women's soccer players
Perth Glory FC (A-League Women) players